David's echymipera (Echymipera davidi), or David's spiny bandicoot, is a species of marsupial in the family Peramelidae. It is found on the island of Kiriwina, in the Trobriand Islands of Papua New Guinea, and may be present on other nearby islands also.

References

Peramelemorphs
Endemic fauna of Papua New Guinea
Marsupials of New Guinea
Mammals of Papua New Guinea
Endangered fauna of Oceania
Mammals described in 1990
Taxonomy articles created by Polbot